Dias was a city of ancient Lycia mentioned by Stephanus of Byzantium. It has been suggested, with some uncertainty, that a coin minted at Dias is in the collection of the British Museum.

Its site is unlocated.

References

Populated places in ancient Lycia
Lost ancient cities and towns
Former populated places in Turkey